Justin Hemmes (born 27 August 1972) is an Australian businessman, heir to the House of Merivale family fortune and principal of the Merivale Group that owns approximately 70 pubs, hotels, restaurants and other venues in the Sydney area.

Biography
Hemmes is the son of John Hemmes (1931-2015) and Merivale Hemmes.

Personal life
From 2012 to 2015, Hemmes was in a relationship with Carla McKinnon, a yoga teacher. From 2015 to 2018, he was in a relationship with Kate Fowler, and they had two daughters together.

Net worth 
Hemmes and family debuted on the Financial Review 2018 Rich List with an estimated net worth of 951 million; that increased to 1.06 billion, in the 2019 Rich List.

Worker pay lawsuit 
In 2019, Hemmes and his company Merivale Group faced a $129 million dollar class action law suit. It alleges around 14,000 Merivale workers who were employed under Hemmes between December 2013 and December 2019 were not paid for the significant over time they were required to work, beyond the maximum allowance of 38 hours per week. Hemmes claimed employees were unlikely to benefit from the class action.

See also 
 The Hermitage, Vaucluse

References

1970s births
Businesspeople from Sydney
Living people
Australian billionaires